Dante or Die Theatre is a British, theatre company specialising in creating and touring site-specific performances. Registered as a company limited by guarantee in 2006, the non-profit organisation creates performances in a variety of spaces such as hotels, leisure centres and storage facilities.

Company members include: Daphna Attias (Co-Artistic Director), Terry O'Donovan (Co-Artistic Director)

Background 

Terry O’Donovan, from Limerick and Daphna Attias, from Tel Aviv formed Dante or Die after they both attended The Royal Central School of Speech and Drama's MA in Advanced Theatre Practice. The name 'Dante or Die' comes from the site where Terry & Daphna first made a site-specific performance together in the skate park of Kennington Park alongside Clare Parke-Davies and Anthea Neagle. The graffiti that has the words Dante or Die is still there today.

Production history 
 Odds On (2022), originally planned to be small site specific performances in betting shops examining the impact of gambling harm, the production was adapted in response to the pandemic and developed into an interactive online digital film. The  interactive short film integrates audience interactivity & provides a simulated experience of gambling, allowing audience members to create their own avatar & spin an artificial slot machine whilst also seeing the protagonist’s narrative as she plays & experiences the highs and lows of winning & losing and the impact that has on her life and those around her. A non-interactive version and an audio described version are also available. The film was created with groups of lived-experience participants from Gordon Moody residential centres, and is now being used by the NHS's National Problem Gambling Clinic to support recovery. The film did a digital tour to over 11 venues including: The Lowry, Norwich Theatre Royal, Attenborough Arts Centre, An Tobar & Mull Theatre, & Wales Millennium Centre.
 Skin Hunger (2021), responding to the pandemic three compelling monologues which explored the fundamental role that touch plays within our lives. Skin Hunger was a powerful live theatre experience set in a hidden chapel in London’s West End which reflected on intimacy and connection. A film about the production – created with award-winning documentary filmmaker Pinny Grylls – is now hosted on Digital Theatre Plus.
 User Not Found (2018), a production about grief and the digital afterlife. Audiences enter a café and receive a set of headphones and a smartphone. Several tables away, a man is grappling in real time with something deeply private. Gradually, audiences bear digital witness, via smartphone and an intimate, funny live performance, to a stranger’s profound experience. User Not Found immerses audiences in both the private and public, provoking surprising considerations of our online afterlife and shifting notions of connection and community. It has toured to over twenty venues across five countries in conjunction with world-class arts organisations such as Brooklyn Academy of Music, Print Screen Festival Israel and Battersea Arts Centre. In 2020, unable to tour due to the pandemic, we transferred User Not Found into a pioneering video podcast, which went on to have over 25k online views, in partnership with The Guardian.
 Take On Me (2016), a collaborative production, co-written by Andrew Muir is set in a local leisure centre after hours. This performance explores body image and provides a fly-on-the-wall perspective of an individuals journey to better themselves to a soundtrack of live acoustic renditions of 1980's hits. This production was the winner of Art Partnership Surrey & Farnham Maltings 'Not For The Likes Of Me' commission in 2015.
 Handle With Care (2016), a co-commission between The Lowry, Harlow Playhouse, South Street Arts Center, Reading and The Lighthouse (Poole). Staged in local self storage containers, this production explores how we accumulate objects and how they can create a sense of home throughout our lives. Production written by Chloe Moss and inspired by consultations with a University College London psychologist who specialised in memory.
 Clunk (2014), a production created for younger audiences, performed outdoors with instruments to explore originality of music. 
 I Do (2013), a jigsaw production displayed across six hotel rooms depicting the moments before a wedding ceremony, co-written by Chloe Moss. Commissioned by Almeida Theatre and South Street Arts, Reading, this production has been performed in Hilton Hotels and Malmaison hotels.
 La Fille À La Mode (2011), premiered at the National Theatre as part of Watch This Space Festival. An exploration and celebration of the It Girl throughout the ages. 
 Side Effects (2011), a unique collaboration with UCL School of Pharmacy to explore our intimate relationships with modern medicine. Inspired by Pharmacopoeia's "Cradle to Grave" exhibition (2005). 
 Caliper Boy (2006), performed in a variety of disused buildings and theatres and inspired by graffiti artists in East London who created the character 'Caliper Boy'. This production explores otherness and our personal relationship with our place in society.

Awards and nominations 

 Odds On
 Won "Best Interactive Film" at the International Media Festival of Wales 2022
 Won "Best Experimental Short Film" at Gully International Festival
 Nominated (shorltisted) for "Best Digital Project" at the 2021 Stage Awards
 Nominated "Best Digital Content" for The Digital Culture Awards
 Skin Hunger
 won "IDEA Performance Award" at the 2022 OFFIES
 User Not Found Video Podcast
 Nominated for the Prix Europa Award
 Nominated (longlisted) for the Digital Culture Awards
 Nominated (finalist) for the 2021 OnComm Award for Innovative & Interactive Performance
 Winner of the Scenesaver Most Innovative Production Award
 User Not Found
 Winner of "The Wee Review Fringe Groundbreaker Award" (2018)
 Winner of the Broadway World Best Theatre Show Award (2018)

Collaborators
 Since 2006 Yaniv Fridel and OJ Shabi (also known as OJ & Fridel) of Soho Sonic Studios have worked as musical directors and composers on several productions including Odds On, Skin Hunger and User Not Found.

See also
 Site-specific theatre
 Postmodern theatre

Press & Associated Publications

External links 
 

Theatre companies in the United Kingdom
Installation art